The 13.2 × 92 mm SR, also known as Mauser 13.2 mm TuF (literally "tank and aircraft", historical military designation), is a semi-rimmed rifle and machine gun cartridge developed by the German Empire for anti-tank and anti-aircraft use which was introduced during World War I. The cartridge was a major step in the development of anti-tank cartridges, being the first one designed for the sole purpose of destroying armored targets.

History 
The cartridge was used in the Mauser 1918 T-Gewehr rifle. Its use was also planned in a new machine gun scheduled for deployment in 1919, the MG 18 TuF.

The 13.2 mm Tuf was designed to counter early British tanks which made their appearance during late World War I. Since a tank's path was difficult to determine prior to its deployment near the front, land mines were difficult to employ as a deterrent to their forward passage. Light artillery pieces pressed into service as anti-tank guns were very effective, but cumbersome and difficult to bring into action quickly enough. Thus, another means of combating these early armored vehicles needed to be found. Since early plate armor was relatively thin due to the need to reduce vehicle weight for low-powered drive trains to propel the unit (and since tanks were mainly designed to protect from machine-gun fire), large-bore rifles could be used to harass and kill tank crews.

When word of the German anti-tank round spread, there was some debate amongst Allied militaries as to whether it should be copied and used as the basis for a new machine gun cartridge. However, after some analysis, an exact copy of the German ammunition was ruled out. Firstly, its performance was regarded as inadequate (compared, for example, to the later .50 BMG – which itself may be regarded as enlarged .30-06 Springfield round and has - therefore - a preceding German Mauser round). Secondly, the 13.2 mm round was a semi-rimmed cartridge, making it sub-optimal for automatic weapons. Nevertheless, when the US military learned of the German round, the .50 BMG was still on the design stage; the fact that the .50 BMG was started prior to discovery of the German round can in no way rule out the possibility that the German round played a significant part in formulating the .50 BMG parameters (even though) the latter emerged with significantly different performance characteristics.

Design 
The 13.2 Tuf utilized a 92 mm-long semi-rimmed case featuring a shallow bottle-neck. It was developed by the Polte ammunition factory in Magdeburg, Germany.

See also
List of rifle cartridges
13 mm caliber

References

External links
 "An Introduction to Anti-Tank Rifle Cartridges" by Anthony G. Williams

1917 establishments in Germany
Heavy machine guns
Military cartridges
Pistol and rifle cartridges
Anti-materiel cartridges